The Modern IN is an electric compact SUV, manufactured by Beijing Automobile Works (BAW) for Modern Auto from 2021. 

Modern Auto was established in Shanghai in 2018. The Modern IN is the first production vehicle of the firm, and was first previewed as the Modern A in October 2020.

Overview

The Modern IN is a compact SUV offered with two variants of battery. A 53kWh battery with an NEDC range of 400 km and a 80kWh battery with an NEDC range of 610 km. Charging from 30% to 80% takes 30 minutes on a fast charger. The power of the Modern In comes from a 160 hp and 280 Nm electric motor. 0 to 100 km/hr acceleration could be done in 7.9 seconds. The Modern In has L2 autonomous driving capabilities and can receive OTA software updates.

References

External links

Front-wheel-drive vehicles
Cars introduced in 2020
Compact sport utility vehicles
Crossover sport utility vehicles
Production electric cars